Blanconia is an unincorporated community in Bee County, in the U.S. state of Texas. According to the Handbook of Texas, the community had a population of 100 in 2010. It is located within the Beeville micropolitan area.

History
The area in what is now known as Blanconia today was established in 1834 when brothers John and Michael Keeting bought a plot of land from Coahuila y Tejas. It was in Refugio County until Bee County's establishment in 1857. It originally had the names Kymo, Pull Tight, and Dark Corners. It was renamed Blanconia when Tom McGuill applied for a post office in 1888 and was named after Blanco Creek. A post office was established at Blanconia in 1888 and remained in operation until sometime after 1930. When Texas was still a part of Mexico, most of the community's early settlers came to the area from Refugio and Goliad. One of them, named Sally Scull, became a horse trader. A Baptist church was established at Blanconia in 1855 and was named after N.R. McDaniel's cattle brand. The community's population zenith was 200 in 1914 and eventually had three stores and churches. The population plunged to 25 and there was only one store in the early 1930s. By the late 1950s, the N-2 Baptist Church, McGuill's store, and St. Catherine's Church were the only buildings in the community. All of the businesses disappeared in 1968 and its population decreased to only 15 and remained at that number until it grew to 30 in 2000. It grew to 100 in 2010.

The first sanctuary for the local Baptist church was established in 1865 until it was moved to Blanconia in 1891. It is one of the oldest Baptist churches in South Texas and serves as a center for the growth of other churches in the area and has had several different pastors. They had met at the Doughty Schoolhouse in Refugio.

Geography

Education
In 1905, Blanconia had a school with one teacher and 12 students. Today, the community is served by the Refugio Independent School District.

References

Unincorporated communities in Bee County, Texas
Unincorporated communities in Texas